Three Mile Cross is a village in the civil parish of Shinfield, to the south of Reading, and immediately north of the adjoining village of Spencers Wood, in the English county of Berkshire. In the 1960s, the M4 Motorway was built and became a natural barrier between the village and Reading.  In the 1980s, the A33 Swallowfield Bypass severed roads to the village of Grazeley lying to the west.

History
Three Mile Cross is best known as the home of the famous 19th-century author, Mary Russell Mitford who wrote a  five-volume book of literary sketches entitled Our Village, which is a series of stories and essays largely about the setting and people of Three Mile Cross. Just to the north-west of the village is the area of five manors called Hartley. During the 13th century, the college of St Nicholas de Vaux in Salisbury was Lord of the Manor of Hartley Dummer. At the Dissolution of the Monasteries, Henry VIII granted this manor for purchase by Sir John Williams (later Lord Williams of Thame). After his death in 1559, his possessions were passed to his daughters. Through various sales and transfers, other major landowners declaring ownership of the area in their title deeds include the Norreyses of Rycote, the Earls of Abingdon, the Jameses of Denford and the Benyons of Englefield.

Business

The Green Park Business Park lies half in the Hartley/Three Mile Cross area of Shinfield parish and half in the Smallmead area of Whitley in Reading borough. The 2 megawatt (peak) Enercon wind turbine, near Junction 11 of the M4, stands in Shinfield. It has been described as "the UK's most visible turbine". It was constructed in November 2005 and is owned by Ecotricity. At a wind speed of  the machine generates 2.05 MW of electricity (less for lower wind speeds) and has the potential to produce 3.5 million units of electricity a year, enough to power 1,063 local homes. The Courage Berkshire Brewery, built in 1978, is also half within Shinfield but was demolished in 2011.

References

Villages in Berkshire
Borough of Wokingham